"Pullin' Me Back" is a song by American rapper Chingy, released as the first single from his third album Hoodstar. The song features actor/R&B singer Tyrese singing the chorus with production by Jermaine Dupri. The track employs a synthesized sample of SWV's 1998 single " Rain" (which itself sampled Jaco Pastorius's "Portrait of Tracy") The video was retired on 106 & Park after being on the countdown for 65 days. The song peaked at number nine on the Billboard Hot 100, making it his fourth and final top ten single. It peaked at number one on the R&B chart, where it was his first number-one single.

The music video features America's Next Top Model cycle 3 runner-up Yaya DaCosta.

Commercial performance
"Pullin' Me Back" debuted on the Billboard Hot 100 the week of July 1, 2006 at number 86. Three months later, it entered the top 10 by moving six spots from number 15 to its peak at number nine, the week of October 7, 2006. It stayed on the chart for twenty weeks. This gave Chingy his fourth and final top ten single on that chart, as well as give Tyrese his second top ten hit.

Music video
Directed by Erik White (who previously directed Chingy in "One Call Away"), The video follows Chingy's relationship with a model (played by America's Next Top Model cycle 3 runner-up Yaya DaCosta). The song's producer Jermaine Dupri makes a cameo in the video.

Charts

Weekly charts

Year-end charts

See also
 List of number-one R&B singles of 2006 (U.S.)
 List of Billboard number-one rap singles of the 2000s

References

2006 singles
2006 songs
Chingy songs
Tyrese Gibson songs
Capitol Records singles
Song recordings produced by Jermaine Dupri
Songs written by Jermaine Dupri
Music videos directed by Erik White
Songs written by Chingy
Songs written by Brian Alexander Morgan
Songs written by Jaco Pastorius
Songs written by LRoc